The 1909 Mississippi College Collegians football team represented Mississippi College as an independent in the 1909 college football season.

Schedule

References

Mississippi College
Mississippi College Choctaws football seasons
College football undefeated seasons
Mississippi College Collegians football